Anacrabro is a genus of square-headed wasps in the family Crabronidae. There are about 15 described species in Anacrabro.

Species
These 15 species belong to the genus Anacrabro:

 Anacrabro argentinus Brèthes, 1913
 Anacrabro benoistianus Leclercq, 1951
 Anacrabro boerhaviae Cockerell, 1895
 Anacrabro cimiciraptor F. Williams, 1928
 Anacrabro cordobae Leclercq, 1996
 Anacrabro corriens Leclercq, 1996
 Anacrabro coruleter Pate, 1947
 Anacrabro eganus Leclercq, 1954
 Anacrabro fritzi Leclercq, 1973
 Anacrabro golbachi Leclercq, 1973
 Anacrabro guayasensis Leclercq, 2007
 Anacrabro meridionalis Ducke, 1908
 Anacrabro mocanus Leclercq, 1973
 Anacrabro ocellatus Packard, 1866
 Anacrabro salvadorius Leclercq, 1973

References

Crabronidae
Articles created by Qbugbot